Infinito Particular is an album by Brazilian singer Marisa Monte, released in 2006.  Its featured songs include "Infinito Particular", "Vilarejo" and "Pra Ser Sincero".  The album was released simultaneously with another album from the same singer: Universo ao Meu Redor.

Track listing 
Infinito Particular (Arnaldo Antunes/Marisa Monte/Carlinhos Brown)
Vilarejo (Monte/Pedro Baby/Brown/Antunes)
Pra Ser Sincero (Brown/Monte)
Levante (Antunes/Brown/Monte/Seu Jorge)
Aquela (Monte/Leonardo Reis)
A Primeira Pedra (Brown/Monte/Antunes)
O Rio (Jorge/Brown/Antunes/Monte)
Gerânio (Nando Reis/Monte/Jennifer Gomes)
Quem foi (Monte/Marcelo Yuka)
Pernambucolismo (Monte/Rodrigo Campello)
Aconteceu (Monte/Antunes)
Até Parece (Monte/Dadi/Antunes/Brown)
Pelo Tempo que Durar (Adriana Calcanhotto/Monte)

Charts

Year-end charts

Notes

Marisa Monte albums
2006 albums